Mykolaiv Oblast Football Federation is a football governing body in the region of Mykolaiv Oblast, Ukraine. The federation is a member of the Regional Council of FFU and the collective member of the FFU itself.

Previous Champions

1938    FC Sudnobudivnyk Mykolaiv (Marti Factory)
1945    FC Sudnobudivnyk Mykolaiv (Marti Factory) (2)
1946    FC Sudnobudivnyk Mykolaiv (Factory of 61 Communards)
1947    FC Dynamo Voznesensk
1948    FC Mashynobudivnyk Mykolaiv
1950    FC Avanhard Mykolaiv
1951    FC Kharchovyk Mykolaiv
1952    FC Varvarivka
1952    FC Kharchovyk Mykolaiv (2)
1953    FC Vodnyk Mykolaiv (Shipyard)
1954    FC Avanhard Mykolaiv (3)
1955    FC Budivelnyk Mykolaiv (Novyi Vodopiy)
1956    FC Avanhard Mykolaiv (Nosenko Factory) (4)
1957    FC Budivelnyk Mykolaiv
1958    FC Torpedo Mykolaiv
1959    FC Torpedo Mykolaiv (2)
1960    FC Torpedo Mykolaiv (3)
1961    FC Torpedo Mykolaiv (4)
1962    FC Vympel Mykolaiv
1963    FC Torpedo Mykolaiv (5)
1964    FC Vympel Mykolaiv (2)
1965    FC Torpedo Mykolaiv (6)
1966    FC Avanhard Mykolaiv (Leninskyi Raion)
1967    FC Avanhard Mykolaiv (Leninskyi Raion) (2)
1968    FC Budivelnyk Pervomaisk
1969    FC Spartak Mykolaiv
1970    FC Khvylia Mykolaiv
1971    FC Spartak Pervomaisk
1972    FC Khvylia Mykolaiv (2)
1973    FC Sudnobudivnyk Mykolaiv (6)
1974    FC Khvylia Mykolaiv (3)
1975    FC Khvylia Mykolaiv (4)
1976    FC Okean Mykolaiv
1977    FC Frehat Pervomaisk
1978    FC Khvylia Mykolaiv (5)
1979    FC Khvylia Mykolaiv (6)
1980    FC Okean Mykolaiv (2)
1981    FC Khvylia Mykolaiv (7)
1982    FC Torpedo Mykolaiv (7)
1983    FC Khvylia Mykolaiv (8)
1984    FC Sudnobudivnyk Mykolaiv (7)
1985    FC Vodnyk Mykolaiv
1986    FC Khvylia Mykolaiv (9)
1987    FC Vodnyk Mykolaiv (2)
1988    FC Vodnyk Mykolaiv (3)
1989    FC Mayak Ochakiv
1990    FC Vodnyk Mykolaiv (4)
1991    FC Olimpiya FC AES Yuzhnoukrainsk
1992-93 FC Olimpiya FC AES Yuzhnoukrainsk (2)
1993-94 FC Nyva Nechayane
1994-95 FC Merkuriy Pervomaisk
1995-96 FC Kolos Stepove
1996-97 FC Kolos Stepove (2)
1997-98 FC Hidroliznyk Olshanske
1998-99 FC Kolos Stepove (3)
1999    FC Kolos Stepove (4)
2000    FC Kolos Stepove (5)
2001    FC Vodnyk Mykolaiv (5)
2002    FC Vodnyk Mykolaiv (6)
2003    FC Kolos Stepove (6)
2004    FC Slavia Bashtanka
2005    FC Torpedo Mykolaiv (8)
2006    FC Torpedo Mykolaiv (9)
2007    FC Voronivka
2008    FC Torpedo Mykolaiv (10)
2009    FC Kazanka
2010    FC Torpedo Mykolaiv (11)
2011    FC Torpedo Mykolaiv (12)
2012    FC Enerhiya Mykolaiv
2013    FC Torpedo Mykolaiv (13)
2014    FC Stepove (7)
2015    FC Vradiivka
2016    FC Vradiivka (2)
2017    MFC Pervomaisk
2018    MFC Pervomaisk (2)
2019    FC Varvarivka Mykolaiv

Top winners
 13 - FC Torpedo Mykolaiv
 9 - FC Khvylia Mykolaiv
 7 - FC Sudnobudivnyk (Avanhard) Mykolaiv
 7 - FC Kolos (Stepove)
 6 - FC Vodnyk Mykolaiv
 2 - 7 clubs
 1 - 20 clubs

Professional clubs
 MFC Mykolaiv (Sudostroitel – Black Sea Shipyard, Avangard), 1937, 1939-1940, 1946-1949, 1957-1968
 FC Sudostroitel – 61 Communards Shipyard Mykolaiv, 1946

See also
 FFU Council of Regions

References

External links
 Mykolaiv Oblast Football Federation

Football in the regions of Ukraine
Football governing bodies in Ukraine
Sport in Mykolaiv Oblast